Brett Darryl Sutter (born June 2, 1987) is a Canadian professional ice hockey player. He is currently playing with the Calgary Wranglers of the American Hockey League (AHL). Sutter was drafted by the Calgary Flames in the sixth round (179th overall) of the 2005 NHL Entry Draft. He made his NHL debut for the Flames during the 2008–09 season, scoring a goal in his first game. He is the son of current Calgary Flames head coach Darryl Sutter, and one of nine members of the famous Sutter family to play in the NHL.

Playing career
As a youth, Sutter played in the 2001 Quebec International Pee-Wee Hockey Tournament with the San Jose Sharks minor ice hockey team.

Junior
Sutter played four Western Hockey League (WHL) seasons with the Kootenay Ice and Red Deer Rebels between 2003 and 2007. During his time in Red Deer, he played with his cousin Brandon, and was coached by his uncle Brent Sutter. He was the Rebels' team captain in his final season of junior in 2006–07, and posted a career high 28 goals.

Professional

Sutter was drafted by the Calgary Flames in the sixth round (179th overall) of the 2005 NHL Entry Draft. At the time his father Darryl Sutter was the General manager of the Flames.

He turned professional in 2007–08. Sutter was one of the Flames' final cuts prior to the season, and was assigned to their American Hockey League (AHL) affiliate, the Quad City Flames, where he recorded four goals and ten points in 75 games. Sutter earned more ice time throughout the season as he adapted to the speed of the professional game. Sutter returned to Quad City for the start of the 2008–09 AHL season. He recorded one goal and six assists in 28 games prior to joining the Flames.

Sutter was recalled by the Flames on December 22, 2008 from Quad City, in a move that generated interest as his father is the Flames general manager. "Everybody makes a big deal about his last name, but there's been lots (of Sutters) before him and will be ones after him," Darryl Sutter said. The Flames stated that he was recalled on merit, and to fill a specific role with the team. He made his NHL debut on December 23, 2008 against the Anaheim Ducks, and scored a goal while being named the game's third star. Sutter played three games with the Flames before being returned to Quad City.

Though he spent the majority of 2009–10 with the Abbotsford Heat of the AHL, Sutter appeared in ten NHL games with the Flames that season. He stuck with the Flames out of training camp as an extra forward to begin the 2010–11 NHL season; however he was a healthy scratch for most games, dressing for only 4 of the Flames' first 16 games. On November 11, he was arrested in Scottsdale, Arizona after allegedly punching a cab driver outside of a bar the night before the Flames' were to play the Phoenix Coyotes. Less than a week later, he and Ian White were traded to the Carolina Hurricanes for Anton Babchuk and Tom Kostopoulos.

Immediately following his trade from Calgary to Carolina, Sutter was assigned to the Hurricanes' top AHL affiliate, the Charlotte Checkers for the remainder of the season. In the following 2011–12 season, on October 6, 2011 he was named the Checkers team captain. Sutter would play the majority of his four-year tenure with the Hurricanes with the Checkers.

Sutter was signed as a free agent by the Minnesota Wild on July 1, 2014 on a two-year, two-way contract.

During his second season within the Wild, Sutter was included in a trade deadline deal on February 29, 2016, to the Los Angeles Kings, coached by his father, and their AHL affiliate, the Ontario Reign, in return for right winger Scott Sabourin.

Despite not being offered a contract with the Kings in the off-season, Sutter opted to remain in the organization by signing a one-year AHL deal with the Reign on July 1, 2016.

Sutter played seven seasons with the Ontario Reign, serving as captain for five years, before returning to his home province in Calgary, Alberta to sign a AHL contract as a free agent for the inaugural season of the Calgary Wranglers on August 3, 2022.

Family
Upon making his NHL debut on December 23, 2008, Brett became the eighth member of the Sutter family to play in the NHL. Along with his father, Darryl, his uncles Brent, Brian, Duane, Rich and Ron all played in the NHL, while his cousin Brandon is a member of the Vancouver Canucks. Another cousin, Shaun, was also a draft pick of the Flames in 1998, and later became an assistant coach of the Regina Pats of the Western Hockey League. Two of his other cousins, Brody and Lukas, also played in the Western Hockey League and have been drafted into the NHL.

Brett's selection by the Flames, 179th overall, was coincidentally the same spot at which his father was drafted. Darryl was claimed by the Chicago Blackhawks, 179th overall, in the 1978 NHL Entry Draft.

Brett is the middle child of Darryl and Wanda Sutter. He has an older sister (Jessica) and younger brother (Christopher).

Brett is married to Erin Sutter and they have one daughter together.

Career statistics

Awards and honours

References

External links

1987 births
Living people
Abbotsford Heat players
Calgary Flames draft picks
Calgary Flames players
Calgary Wranglers players
Canadian ice hockey centres
Carolina Hurricanes players
Charlotte Checkers (2010–) players
Ice hockey people from Alberta
Iowa Wild players
Kootenay Ice players
Minnesota Wild players
Ontario Reign (AHL) players
People from Beaver County, Alberta
Quad City Flames players
Red Deer Rebels players
Brett